In Caucasian Folklore, an almas, alma or almasty, is a cryptid, folk creature said to inhabit the Caucasus, Tian Shan and Pamir Mountains of Central Asia and the Altai Mountains of western Mongolia.

Etymology
The term "almas" and numerous variants thereof appear in Mongolian, Turkic languages and Iranian languages.

Writing in 1964, scholar P. R. Rinčen says that "the origin of the old name is quite unknown … and it does not lend itself for translation in other languages".

The name is connected to a variety of place names (toponyms) in southwestern Mongolia, including Almasyn Dobo ('the Hills of Almases'), Almasyn Ulan Oula ('the Red Mountains of Almases') and ('the Red Rocks of Almases').

Folk belief in the almas in Oburkhangai and Bayankhongor has resulted in a name-avoidance taboo there, wherein the entities may be referred to as akhai, meaning 'uncle-brother'.

The folk traditions of Darkhad include the Almas khara Tenguer, meaning 'Almas the Black God' and associated with highland prairies and mountain forests. According to Rinčen, the god may be offered edible wild roots and wild animal meat.

Description
Nikolay Przhevalsky describes the almas, as related to him under the name kung-guressu ("man-beast"), as follows:We were told that it had a flat face like that of a human being, and that it often walked on two legs, that its body was covered with a thick black fur, and its feet armed with enormous claws; that its strength was terrible, and that not only were hunters afraid of attacking it, but that the inhabitants removed their habitations from those parts of the country which it visited.Heaney suggests that the almas should be identified with the Arimaspi, a group of legendary humanoid creatures said to inhabit the Riphean Mountains.

In science 
In 1964, a Soviet scientist from the Soviet Academy of Sciences proposed that the Almasti could be a relict population of Neanderthals still living in Siberia.

In 1992, a group of scientists went on an expedition to search for the almas in the Caucasus Mountains.

A 2014 study concluded that hair samples attributed to the almas were from species including Ursus arctos, Equus caballus and Bos taurus. Gutiérrez and Pine concluded that several of these samples were from the brown bear.

See also
 Chuchuna
 Wild man
 Yeti

Notes

Sources

Mongolian legendary creatures
Turkic legendary creatures
Turkish folklore
Kazakh folklore
Deities